Alan Roy Drysdall (1934 – 11 January 2017) was an English geologist who worked in southern Africa. The mineral Drysdallite was named after him. Drysdall was a noted philatelist and a signatory to the Roll of Distinguished Philatelists.

Early life
Alan Drysdall was born in Southampton in 1933. He received his doctorate in Geology from the University of Southampton in 1957.

Career
Drysdall was the director of the Zambian geological survey. The mineral Drysdallite was named after him.

Philately
Outside work, Drysdall was a noted philatelist who was a stalwart of the Rhodesia, Transvall and Natal Study Circles. He signed the Roll of Distinguished Philatelists in 2003. He also signed the Roll of Distinguished Philatelists of Southern Africa.

Selected publications

Geology
 Drysdall, A. R.  ????.  The tin belt of the Southern Province, summary report, 2nd edition.  Lusaka: Government Printer.
 Drysdall, A. R., and P. D. Denman, N. J. Money.  1967.  Some aspects of the geology of the Siankondobo coalfield.  Lusaka: Government Printer.
 Drysdall, A. R.  et al.  19??a.  Coal resources of the Zambezi Valley, II. Siankodobo – The Kanzinze basin, geology of the shafts.  Lusaka: Government Printer.
 19??b.  Coal resources of the Zambezi Valley III, Siankodobo- the Izuma Kanzinze basin.  Lusaka: Government Printer.
 19??c.  Coal resources of the Zambezi Valley IV: Sikankodobo- The Norfthern Part of the Kanzinze basin.  Lusaka: Government Printer.

Philately
 Mashonaland: A Postal History, 1890-96
 Transvaal - Revenue and Telegraph Stamps 1995
 Rhodesia's Role in the Second Anglo-Boer War

References 

British philatelists
Signatories to the Roll of Distinguished Philatelists
1934 births
2017 deaths
20th-century British geologists
Scientists from Southampton
Fellows of the Royal Philatelic Society London